The 8th Hong Kong Awards ceremony, honored the best films of 1988 and took place on 9 April 1989 at Hong Kong Academy for Performing Arts, Wan Chai, Hong Kong. The ceremony was hosted by Lydia Shum, Eric Tsang  and Philip Chan, during the ceremony awards are presented in 14 categories. The ceremony was sponsored by City Entertainment Magazine.

Awards
Winners are listed first, highlighted in boldface, and indicated with a double dagger.

References

External links
Official website of the Hong Kong Film Awards

1989
1988 film awards
1989 in Hong Kong